Gary Michael Gutting (April 11, 1942 – January 18, 2019) was an American philosopher and holder of an endowed chair in philosophy at the University of Notre Dame.
His daughter is writer Tasha Alexander.

Work
Gutting was an expert on the philosopher Michel Foucault and an editor of Notre Dame Philosophical Reviews.
Through his publications in such media outlets as The New York Times and The Stone, he adopted the role of a public intellectual. He dealt with both continental and analytic philosophy and had written on bridging the analytic-continental divide.

Books
 Talking God: Philosophers on Belief, W. W. Norton & Company, 2016
 What Philosophy Can Do, W. W. Norton & Company, 2015
 Thinking the Impossible: French Philosophy since 1960, Oxford University Press, 2011
 What Philosophers Know: Case Studies in Recent Analytic Philosophy, Cambridge University Press, 2009
 Foucault: A Very Short Introduction, Oxford University Press, 2005
 French Philosophy in the Twentieth Century, Cambridge University Press, 2001 
 Pragmatic Liberalism and the Critique of Modernity, Cambridge University Press, 1999
 Michel Foucault's Archaeology of Scientific Reason, Cambridge University Press, 1989
 Religious Belief and Religious Skepticism, University of Notre Dame Press, 1982
 Paradigms and Revolutions: Appraisals and Applications of Thomas Kuhn's Philosophy of Science. South Bend, Indiana: University of Notre Dame Press, 1980 OCLC 163461098
 Continental Philosophy of Science, Blackwell Publishers, 2004

References

External links
 Gutting at University of Notre Dame

21st-century American philosophers
Continental philosophers
American Roman Catholics
Analytic philosophers
Philosophy academics
Foucault scholars
Philosophers of science
Philosophers of religion
University of Notre Dame faculty
Saint Louis University alumni
1942 births
2019 deaths